Mohamed Salman Al-Khuwalidi (born 19 June 1981 in Dhahran) is a Saudi Arabian long jumper. His personal best is 8.48 metres, achieved in July 2006 in Sotteville-lès-Rouen, France. This is also the current Asian record.

At the global level, he competed at the 2008 Summer Olympics and 2010 Asian Games, won bronze medals at the IAAF World Cup and IAAF World Indoor Championships, and represented Saudi Arabia at the World Championships in Athletics in 2007 and 2009. He is a three-time Asian champion, having won at the Asian Indoor Athletics Championships in 2004 and 2008, as well as the 2007 Asian Athletics Championships.

He is coached by Messaoud Bouhouche.

International competitions

References

1981 births
Living people
Saudi Arabian male long jumpers
Athletes (track and field) at the 2008 Summer Olympics
Olympic athletes of Saudi Arabia
Athletes (track and field) at the 2002 Asian Games
Athletes (track and field) at the 2010 Asian Games
World Athletics Championships athletes for Saudi Arabia
Asian Games competitors for Saudi Arabia
Islamic Solidarity Games competitors for Saudi Arabia
21st-century Saudi Arabian people